There are two Arsenal hooligan firms, The Gooners (a mutation of the club's nickname, The Gunners) and The Herd.

The Gooners were a violent football hooligan firm mainly active in the 1980s and 1990s. However, the name is now used by most non-hooligan Arsenal supporters.

The Herd was mainly active between the late 1970s and early 1990s, it still exists. The Herd are a hooligan gang. The main rivals of The Herd in the 1980s and in the present day are West Ham's I.C.F., Tottenham Hotspur's Yid Army, Chelsea's Headhunters and Millwall's F-Troop (later known as the Millwall Bushwackers). Although The Herd was mainly considered to be a hooligan gang, a few members were not physically violent. Dainton Connell (aka Dainton "The Bear" Cornnell) was considered a folk hero by many Arsenal fans, but died in a car crash in 2007, with 3,000 mourners attending his funeral including several ex players. The Herd's two most notorious clashes were with Millwall fans at Highbury in 1988 and with Galatasaray fans in City Hall Square, Copenhagen in 2000.

References

Arsenal F.C.
British football hooligan firms
Gangs in London